What Am I Gonna Do About You is the eleventh studio album by American country music artist Reba McEntire. The album was released September 2, 1986 on MCA Records and was produced by McEntire and Jimmy Bowen. It was her second #1 album on the Billboard country charts, containing two #1 singles, What Am I Gonna Do About You and One Promise Too Late. The opening track "Why Not Tonight" was also featured on the end credits of the 1990 film Tremors which was her film debut.

The album debuted at #36 on the Country Albums chart for the week of October 25, 1986, and peaked at #1 for the week of January 21, 1987. It stayed at the top for 3 consecutive weeks.

Track listing

Personnel 

 Reba McEntire – lead and harmony vocals
 John Hobbs – pianos, organ
 Bill Cooley – electric guitar
 Don Potter – acoustic guitar 
 Billy Joe Walker Jr. – acoustic guitar, electric guitar 
 Reggie Young – electric guitar
 Donnie LaValley – steel guitar
 David Hungate – bass guitar
 Eddie Bayers – drums
 Matt Betton – drums
 Ricky Solomon – fiddle
 Suzy Hoskins – harmony vocals
 Pake McEntire – harmony vocals

Production 
 Jimmy Bowen – producer
 Reba McEntire – producer
 Ron Treat – recording engineer 
 Mark J. Coddington – second engineer
 Tim Kish – second engineer
 Russ Martin – second engineer
 Chuck Ainlay – overdub recording 
 Willie Pevear – overdub recording 
 Steve Tillisch – overdub recording 
 Bob Bullock – mixing
 Glenn Meadows – mastering 
 Simon Levy – art direction, design 
 Jim McGuire – photography

Studios
 Recorded and Mixed at Sound Stage Studios (Nashville, Tennessee).
 Mastered at Masterfonics (Nashville, Tennessee).

Charts

Album

Singles

Certifications and sales

References

1986 albums
Reba McEntire albums
MCA Records albums
Albums produced by Jimmy Bowen